The men's rings was an artistic gymnastics event held as part of the gymnastics at the 1904 Summer Olympics programme. It was the second time the event was held at the Olympics. An unknown number of gymnasts competed, only three are known. The competition was held on Friday, October 28, 1904. All three of the known competitors, the medalists, were American. The event was won by Herman Glass, with William Merz second and Emil Voigt third.

Background

This was the second appearance of the event, which is one of the five apparatus events held every time there were apparatus events at the Summer Olympics (no apparatus events were held in 1900, 1908, 1912, or 1920).

Competition format

Each gymnast performed three exercises on the rings, all voluntary in design. Three judges each gave scores from 0 to 5 for each exercise; thus, the maximum for an exercise was 15 and the maximum total was 45.

Schedule

Results

References

Sources
 
 

Rings
Men's 1904